Not to be confused with Gediminas Vagnorius, another former Prime Minister of Lithuania.

Gediminas Kirkilas (born 30 August 1951) is a Lithuanian politician who was Prime Minister of Lithuania from 2006 to 2008.

Life and career
Kirkilas was born in Vilnius in 1951. After returning from mandatory military service, from 1972 to 1978 he worked on several cultural monuments (e.g. churches or the Verkiai Palace) restoring their interior and especially rolled gold and molding. In 1978–1982 he studied political science. After graduation, he joined the Communist Party of Lithuania and took various posts there. When Algirdas Brazauskas was appointed the secretary of the party, Kirkilas became his press secretary.

Since independence was declared on 11 March 1990, Kirkilas was involved in the state matters and was elected to the Seimas seven times, representing the Democratic Labour Party of Lithuania (in 1992, 1996 and 2000) and the Social Democratic Party of Lithuania (in 2004, 2008, 2012 and 2016). He was appointed the Minister of National Defence of Lithuania on 7 December 2004.

In 2004, he received an MBA from the International Business School in Vilnius.

He was confirmed by the Seimas on 4 July 2006 after Zigmantas Balčytis, the provisional Prime Minister, failed to gather the required support from the parliament. He stepped down on 27 November 2008 after the 2008 parliamentary elections, and gave way to Andrius Kubilius to start his second term as the prime minister.

In January 2007 he was praised in The Economist as an unsung hero whose "minority administration has surpassed all expectations".

Premiership of Gediminas Kirkilas
During his time in office GDP rose by 21 percent, financing of socially sensitive areas increased, strategic decisions were made in the field of energy, personal income tax decreased and relations with Poland were strengthened. Kirkilas' Cabinet was criticized for its denial of coming economic crisis and for not obeying fiscal rules.

Controversies
In July 2007, Kirkilas signed the protocol assigning the members of newly formed governmental work group to assist the energy company "Lietuvos energija" in negotiating and consulting with potential foreign partners for a new Ignalina nuclear power plant project. A public turmoil followed after the name of  occurred in the list of the work group. After the so-called State Security Department scandal in 2006, when a senior officer Vytautas Pociūnas died under controversial circumstances in a hotel in Belarus, the witnesses described Darius Jurgelevičius as a middleman transmitting then Lithuanian Foreign Ministry's clerk Albinas Januška's influence to State Security Department. Albinas Januška currently works as G. Kirkilas's advisor.

In July 2007, before handing his powers to his successors,  the chairman of the State Price and Energy Control Commission spoke about the ties between gas companies and the Prime Minister Kirkilas, saying: "a gas company "Lietuvos dujos" is privately lobbying G. Kirkilas and the second Lithuanian monopolist gas company  – Ministry of Economics. CEO of Lietuvos dujos, Viktoras Valentukevičius, meets Kirkilas privately to play tennis".

In October 2014, Fair Observer featured an interview with Kirkilas where he spoke on his pro-nuclear energy stance.

References 

Prime Ministers of Lithuania
Ministers of Defence of Lithuania
Members of the Seimas
Lithuanian communists
Politicians from Vilnius
1951 births
Living people
Recipients of the Order of the Cross of Terra Mariana, 2nd Class
21st-century Lithuanian politicians
Communist Party of Lithuania politicians
Democratic Labour Party of Lithuania politicians
Social Democratic Party of Lithuania politicians
Social Democratic Labour Party of Lithuania politicians